Hong Kong Cancer Fund was established in 1987 with a mission to better the quality of cancer support in Hong Kong. It is the largest cancer support organisation in Hong Kong providing free information and professional services to anyone who has or is affected by cancer.

History 
Hong Kong Cancer Fund was established in 1987 to provide support, information and care to those living with cancer, and to increase awareness and knowledge of cancer in the community.

Services and Activities

Wellness programme and therapeutic workshops 
Help cancer patients to relax, tackle negative emotions, relieve stress and restore confidence through yoga, meditation, breathing exercises, horticulture, music and art therapy.

References

External links

www.cancer-fund.org – Hong Kong's Largest Cancer Support Organisation
pink.cancer-fund.org - Pink Revolution (Breast Cancer Awareness Campaign in Hong Kong)

Cancer organizations based in China
Medical and health organisations based in Hong Kong
Organizations established in 1987